Cardinal Sin,  cardinal sin, or cardinal syn may refer to:

Sins
 Seven deadly sins, often called the "cardinal sins"
 Mortal sin (Catholicism)
 The three cardinal sins in Judaism, see Self-sacrifice in Jewish law

People
 Jaime Sin (1928–2005), Archbishop of Manila and cardinal

Music
 Cardinal Sin (band), a black metal band formed in 1995
 "Cardinal Sin", a song by Black Sabbath from their 1994 album Cross Purposes
 "The Cardinal Sin", a song by Dead Can Dance from their 1985 album Spleen and Ideal
 "Cardinal Sin", a song by Powerwolf from their 2013 album Preachers of the Night

Other arts and entertainment
 Cardinal Syn, a 1998 3D fighting game for the PlayStation
 The Cardinal Sins, a novel by Andrew Greeley
 Cardinal Sin (Banksy), a sculpture by graffiti artist Banksy